MarketAxess Holdings Inc. (MarketAxess) is an international financial technology company that operates an electronic trading platform for the institutional credit markets, and also provides market data and post-trade services. It enables institutional investors and broker-dealers to trade credit instruments, including corporate bonds, and other types of fixed income products.

MarketAxess was founded in 2000 by Richard McVey, who is still the company’s Chairman & Chief Executive Officer. Headquartered in New York, MarketAxess has 744 employees and serves clients in the Americas, Europe, Latin America and Asia. Today, it is the market leader in the electronic trading of US corporate bonds, with 85% of investment-grade and 84% of high-yield debt traded electronically on its platform. That equates to 20% of all corporate bond trading volume in the US. As of October 2020, the company is valued at $20.43bn.

History

McVey originally proposed the model for MarketAxess in 1999 as part of J.P. Morgan's Lab Morgan program, which was designed to back executives’ ideas for using web-based technology. He launched the company as an independent venture in 2000, with $24 million in capital which he’d raised from other market participants including Bear Stearns.

In November that year, MarketAxess began trading investment-grade corporate bonds and gave investors access to new issues and research.

In 2001, MarketAxess acquired Trading Edge Inc., which owned BondLink, a start-up bond company that had enabled investors to buy and sell bonds online.

The company went public in 2004, with a stock value of $11 a share.

In 2012, MarketAxess announced a partnership to link up with BlackRock’s Aladdin platform.

That year it announced the launch of its all-to-all trading marketplace, Open Trading.

In 2013, MarketAxess acquired London-based Trax.

In 2015, MarketAxess and BlackRock extended their Open Trading partnership, already in place in the US, to the European credit markets.

In March the company announced the extension of its all-to-all Open Trading partnership with BlackRock to Asia, focused mainly on US dollar-denominated corporate and sovereign bonds and other securities traded by market participants in the region.

In August 2019, the company announced it would enter Treasury trading with the acquisition of the LiquidityEdge platform.

in September 2020, the company agreed to buy MuniBrokers.

In September 2020, the company entered into an agreement to acquire the Regulatory Reporting Hub.

In April 2022, MarketAxess and MSCI announced a collaboration on fixed income indices, portfolio construction products, and ESG data that would leverage MSCI's ESG data.

In May 2022, MarketAxess was one of multiple financial services firms that APARMA, or the APAs and ARMs Association, set up to represent the views of members on regulation and laws influencing related businesses of the companies involved and to facilitate dialogue between policymakers and regulators. Chris Smith, head of post-trade services at the firm, would be its first chairperson.

In June 2022, MarketAxess was one of three companies that announced a collaboration to become a consolidated tape, or single price feed, provider for bond prices through the public procurement process of ESMA. News of this effort first appeared in November 2021. If approved, the joint venture would be operated independently from its existing business. Like Tradeweb and Bloomberg, the other two firms, MarketAxess already operated its own APA prior to this announcement. This was in response to the EU's effort to unify capital markets and improve trading data quality. it may be the first step towards having this for a range of asset classes. It's also a move to make European capital markets more like those of the US, which has TRACE.

In September 2022, the company announced an extension of its partnership with Broadway Technologies that would see a request-for-quote workflow featuring in its US Treasury trading marketplace.

In January 2023, the company announced president and chief operating officer Chris Concannon would replace current CEO Richard McKey in April 2023. Concannon had been in his roles since 2019.

References

External links

2000 establishments in New York City
Financial services companies based in New York City
2004 initial public offerings
Publicly traded companies based in New York City
Electronic trading platforms
Financial services companies established in 2000